International Standard IEC/ISO 81346 series "Industrial systems, installations and equipment and industrial products – structuring principles and reference designations"  defines the rules for reference designation systems (RDS). It is published as a double logo standard prepared by IEC technical committee 3: Information structures and elements, identification and marking principles, documentation and graphical symbols, in cooperation with ISO technical committee 10: Technical product documentation. The 81346 series replaces the deprecated IEC 61346:1996.

Contents
 Part 1: Basic rules (IEC 81346-1:2022)  
 Part 2: Classification of objects and codes for classes (IEC 81346-2:2019) 
 Part 10: Power Systems (ISO/IEC 81346-10:2022) 
 Part 12: Construction Works (ISO/IEC 81346-12:2018)

Double Logo Standards
Future developments of the standards on reference designations will be made in cooperation between the IEC and the ISO and published as IEC 81346. (Standards developed in cooperation between IEC and ISO are assigned numbers in the 80000 series)

Outline
The standard consists of two parts and two supplements:

 EN 81346-1: General rules (IEC 81346-1:2009)
 EN 81346-2: Classification of objects and coding of classes (IEC 81346-2:2020-10)
The supplementary sheets for application guidelines (IEC/TR 61346-3:2001) and considerations of terms and their relationships (IEC 61346-4:1998) for DIN EN 61346 were withdrawn in May 2010 without replacement.

They are translations of the International Standard IEC 81346 published by the IEC. In 1997 the IEC changed the numbering of the IEC publications and added 60000 to the standard numbers used up to 1997. For example, IEC 61346 from 1996 was published under the number IEC 1346 but was listed under IEC 61346.

From 2010, the standards for reference marking will be published as a joint IEC/ ISO standard in the 80000 number range and then published under the number 81346.

Preceding Standard
Preceding standard IEC 61346:1996 has been withdrawn and is replaced by IEC/ISO 81346.

RDS-CW
81346-12 is also known as RDS-CW (Reference Designation System for Construction Works). It is maintained by ISO Working Group ISO/TC10/SC10/WG10  responsible for Reference Designation within ISO Process Plant Documentation sub committee SC10. RDS-CW has been designed as an international classification system that can be used by BIM allowing for the prospect of integrating classification systems for construction works with classification systems for the Power sector (currently in revision in 81346-10).

See also
 Reference designator
 Functional_specification
 List of IEC standards

References

External links 
 
 Dansk Standards Hanbook 166 UK 2016-12-01

61346